Skwentna Airport  is a state-owned public-use airport located in Skwentna, in the Matanuska-Susitna Borough of the U.S. state of Alaska.

As per Federal Aviation Administration records, the airport had 496 passenger boardings (enplanements) in calendar year 2008, an increase of 64% from the 303 enplanements in 2007. This airport is included in the FAA's National Plan of Integrated Airport Systems for 2009–2013, which categorized it as a general aviation facility.

Facilities and aircraft 
It has one runway designated 10/28 with a gravel surface measuring 3,400 by 75 feet (1,036 x 23 m). For the 12-month period ending December 31, 2009, the airport had 3,500 aircraft operations, an average of 291 per month: 71% general aviation and 29% air taxi.

References

External links 
 FAA Alaska airport diagram (GIF)

Airports in Matanuska-Susitna Borough, Alaska